Genius of Modern Music: Volume 1 is the name given to at least four different compilation albums by jazz pianist Thelonious Monk. Each version comprises some of Monk's first recordings as band leader for Blue Note, recorded in 1947 (and sometimes 1948). The original 10-inch LP with this title was compiled in 1951.

Two different CD compilations have been given this title. Both redistribute the material from the two volumes in a very different order. The individual volumes of both CD compilations omit a July 2, 1948, session featuring "Evidence", "Misterioso", "Epistrophy", "I Mean You", "All The Things You Are", and "I Should Care" which were released on a Milt Jackson compilation instead. A "monochrome cover" 2-CD set called "The Complete Genius" follows the track order of the original monochrome CDs but adds all 10 released Blue Note performances of these missing 6 titles between the contents of "Volume 1" and "Volume 2."

Track listing of Blue Note LP 5002 (10-inch 8 song LP, compiled 1951) 

Side 1:
'Round Midnight (as "Round About Midnight")
Off Minor
Ruby my Dear
I Mean You
Side 2:
Thelonious
Epistrophy
Well You Needn't
Misterioso

Track listing of Blue Note BLP-1510 (12-inch 12-song LP, monochrome yellow cover, compiled 1956) 
Side 1:
'Round Midnight (as "Round About Midnight")
Off Minor
Ruby my Dear
I Mean You
April In Paris
In Walked Bud
Side 2:
Thelonious
Epistrophy
Misterioso
Well You Needn't
Introspection
Humph

Track listing of earlier "yellow monochrome" cover CD, compiled circa 1989 
Humph
Evonce (alternate take)
Evonce
Suburban Eyes
Suburban Eyes (alternate take)
Thelonious
Nice Work If You Can Get It (alternate take)
Nice Work If You Can Get It
Ruby My Dear (alternate take)
Ruby My Dear
Well You Needn't
Well You Needn't (alternate take)
April In Paris (alternate take)
April In Paris
Off Minor
Introspection
In Walked Bud
Monk's Mood
Who Knows
'Round Midnight
Who Knows  (alternate take)

1-6 recorded Oct 15, 1947
7-16 recorded Oct 24, 1947
17-21 recorded Nov 21, 1947

Re-issue
The sessions were recompiled, under the same title, on CD in 2001 as part of the RVG series. The cover art for the original 8-song LP was used. While the earlier CD grouped all takes of each title together, the recompilation put the alternate takes at the end of each session.

The July 2, 1948, session featuring "Evidence", "Misterioso", "Epistrophy", "I Mean You", "All The Things You Are" and "I Should Care" was released on Blue Note CD Milt Jackson: Wizard of the Vibes.

Re-issue track listing, compiled 2001
Humph
Evonce
Suburban Eyes
Thelonious
Evonce (alternate take)
Suburban Eyes (alternate take)
Nice Work If You Can Get It
Ruby My Dear
Well You Needn't
April In Paris
Off Minor
Introspection
Nice Work If You Can Get It (alternate take)
Ruby My Dear (alternate take)
Well You Needn't (alternate take)
April In Paris (alternate take)
In Walked Bud
Monk's Mood
Who Knows?
'Round Midnight
Who Knows? (alternate take)

1-6 recorded Oct 15, 1947
7-16 recorded Oct 24 1947
17-21 recorded Nov 21, 1947

Personnel
Thelonious Monk - piano
Art Blakey - drums
Idrees Sulieman - trumpet (tracks 1 - 6)
Danny Quebec West - alto saxophone (tracks 1 - 6)
Billy Smith - tenor saxophone (tracks 1 - 6)
Gene Ramey - bass (tracks 1 - 16)
George Taitt - trumpet (tracks 17 - 21)
Sahib Shihab - alto saxophone (tracks 17 - 21)
Bob Paige - bass (tracks 17 - 21)

See also

References

External links
Album's page on Blue Note website

1951 debut albums
Thelonious Monk albums
1951 compilation albums
Blue Note Records compilation albums